Warton Crag is a limestone hill in north west Lancashire, England. It lies to the north west of Warton village, in City of Lancaster district. Two areas are Local Nature Reserves, called Warton Crag and Warton Crag Quarry. Different sections are owned by Lancashire County Council, the Wildlife Trust for Lancashire, Manchester and North Merseyside, Lancaster City Council and the Royal Society for the Protection of Birds.

Two caves on the west side of the hill called Dog Holes and Badger Hole show signs of early human occupation, with excavations finding a range of artefacts.

The summit of the hill is  the site of a small multivallate hillfort, which has long been assumed to date to the Iron Age period. The approximately  enclosure was defended by rock scarps and steep slopes to the south and west with triple stone ramparts forming an arc on the other sides. However research by Historic England in 2016 using lidar proposed that the structure was instead "some form of non-defensive hilltop enclosure, possibly dating to the Late Bronze Age."

A beacon was erected on the crag in 1988 as part of a re-enactment of the beacon chain alerting the country to  the Spanish Armada, on its 400th anniversary. It was lit again in 2012 for the Diamond Jubilee of Elizabeth II, in 2016 for her 90th birthday, and in 2022 for her Platinum Jubilee. 

Many plants are found on the crag, including horseshoe vetch near its northern limit, spindle tree and many ferns.  The site is rich in butterflies, including the rare pearl bordered fritillary and high brown fritillary. Much of the hill is listed as a Site of Special Scientific Interest, being considered the best example of limestone grassland in Lancashire, with areas of Limestone pavement.

The former quarry on the west of the crag is a regular breeding site for peregrine falcons and is protected by a Falcon Watch team of volunteers.

The crag is used by rock-climbers, and a fell race on the crag takes place annually as part of Warton Children's Sports Day.

See also
Scheduled monuments in Lancashire
Leighton Hall
Leighton Moss RSPB reserve
Morecambe Bay

References

External links
Arnside and Silverdale AONB page on Warton Crag
A Guide to Warton Crag Nature Reserves pdf of 20-page leaflet including map
Warton Crag Quarry LNR Management Plan  2020 - 2025
Lake District Bouldering map Click on green star at south of map, north of Carnforth, for Warton Crag information

Mountains and hills of Lancashire
Local Nature Reserves in Lancashire
Geography of the City of Lancaster
Sites of Special Scientific Interest in Lancashire
Scheduled monuments in Lancashire